Dobrepolje railway station is the principal railway station in Predstruge, Slovenia.

References

External links 
Official site of the Slovenian railways 

Railway stations in Slovenia